Ahead of Their Time is a live album by The Mothers of Invention. It was recorded at the Royal Festival Hall, London, England, on October 25, 1968, and released in 1993 on CD by Barking Pumpkin. It was reissued on Rykodisc in 1995.

Performances
The first part of the set is a one-off performance of a musical play retrospectively entitled Progress?, and featuring members of the BBC Symphony Orchestra. Portions of this performance originally found their way on to the Mystery Disc (1998) contained on the second 1986 box of The Old Masters and the Honker Home Video release of Uncle Meat (1969). Much of the humor and storyline of the play is lost to the casual listener due to primitive recording techniques and the visual nature of some of the performance, necessitating extensive liner notes by Zappa.

According to Zappa's liner notes, the remainder of the set is "A fair – not outstanding – 1968 Mothers of Invention rock concert performance". Different edits of snatches from the second part of the performance ("The Orange County Lumber Truck" and "Prelude to the Afternoon of a Sexually Aroused Gas Mask") were originally released on Weasels Ripped My Flesh (1970).

Track listing 
All tracks written, composed and arranged by Frank Zappa.

Personnel 
 Frank Zappa – guitar, vocals
 Ian Underwood – alto saxophone, piano
 Bunk Gardner – tenor saxophone, clarinet
 Euclid James "Motorhead" Sherwood – baritone saxophone, tambourine
 Don Preston – electric piano, odd noises (homemade oscillation boxes)
 Roy Estrada – bass guitar, vocals
 Jimmy Carl Black – drums, vocals
 Arthur Dyer Tripp III – drums, percussion
 Members of the BBC Symphony Orchestra

References

External links 
 Lyrics and information
 Release details

Frank Zappa live albums
1993 live albums
Barking Pumpkin Records albums
The Mothers of Invention albums